The Abbot Constantine (French:L'abbé Constantin) may refer to:

 The Abbot Constantine (novel), an 1882 novel by Ludovic Halevy
 The Abbot Constantine (1925 film), a silent film adaptation directed by Julien Duvivier 
 The Abbot Constantine (1933 film), a sound film adaptation directed by Jean-Paul Paulin